Ebisu Station is the name of two Japanese railway stations.

Ebisu Station (Tokyo) (恵比寿駅) in Shibuya, Tokyo
Ebisu Station (Hyōgo) (恵比須駅) in Miki, Hyōgo